Herod’s Palace may refer to any of several palace-fortresses built (or rebuilt from previous fortresses) during the reign of Herod the Great, King of Judea from 37 BC to 4 BC. Mostly in ruins today, several have been excavated.

 Herod's Palace (Jerusalem), in the northwest corner of the city walls of the Upper City 
 Herod's Palace (Herodium), winter palace at Herodium in the Judean desert 12 kilometers south of Jerusalem
 Masada, on a small mountain
 Caesarea Maritima, on a promontory in the sea
 Three winter palaces at Jericho
 Machaerus, Hasmonean fortress rebuilt by Herod in 30 BC
 Cypros Palace near Jericho, named by Herod in memory of his mother, Cypros
 Alexandrium, a Hasmonean palace which Herod rebuilt lavishly.

See also
 Herods Hotels, a luxury hotel brand
 Herodian architecture

Herod the Great